Watch This Liquid Pour Itself is the second studio album by Norwegian-American musician Okay Kaya. It was released on 24 January 2020 through Jagjaguwar.

The first single from the album, "Baby Little Tween" was released on November 12, 2019.

Critical reception
Watch This Liquid Pour Itself was met with generally favorable reviews from critics. At Metacritic, which assigns a weighted average rating out of 100 to reviews from mainstream publications, this release received an average score of 73, based on 5 reviews.

Track listing

See also
List of 2020 albums

References

2020 albums
Jagjaguwar albums